William Spicer (fl. 1362–1395) was an English politician.

Spicer was Mayor of Devizes in 1377–1379 and 1381–1382.

He was Member of Parliament for Devizes, Wiltshire in 1362, February 1383, September 1388, January 1390, 1393 and 1395.

References

Year of birth missing
Year of death missing
English MPs 1362
14th-century births
Mayors of Devizes
English MPs February 1383
English MPs September 1388
English MPs January 1390
English MPs 1393
English MPs 1395